Apology is a made for HBO original film that premiered on July 27, 1986. The movie is based on the artwork of Allan Bridge and the novel he inspired, Mr. Apology. The film was eventually released on video and syndicated to cable and network television outlets. It stars Lesley Ann Warren, Peter Weller and John Glover. The film was titled in some markets as Apology for Murder. It was the first film produced under the HBO Pictures banner.

Background
Producers Les Alexander, Richard Park, and Richard Smith developed the idea from a similarly themed art project in New York. They hired Mark Medoff, who had won a Tony Award for his play Children of a Lesser God, to write the script. Filming was done in New York's SoHo district and Greenwich Village, with additional shooting in Toronto.

Executive producer Roger Gimbel cast Warren in the lead role based on their prior working relationship in Betrayal (1978). The part of Lily in Apology was Warren's first role in a thriller film.

Plot
In New York City, avant garde sculptor Lily McGuire (Lesley Ann Warren) lives a complicated and frustrating life as she tries to not only provide for herself and her daughter, but debut her latest artwork known as Apology. The design is a two-part exhibit consisting of a walkthrough sculpture of advanced mechanical design and a phone service that allows callers to anonymously leave confessions of whatever they desire on the answering machine. However, someone has been calling the line and using it to announce a string of recent high-profile killings. After contacting the police,  Detective Hungate (Peter Weller) advises Lily to take the threats seriously. Eventually, the serial killer stops his phone calls and intends to murder Lily to the sounds of the exhibit's programmed confessions.  Charles S. Dutton, Harvey Fierstein, and Chris Noth co-star.

Cast
 Lesley Ann Warren as Lily 
 Peter Weller as Rad Hungate 
 George Loros as Frank 
 John Glover as Philip 
 Jimmie Ray Weeks as Claude 
 Harvey Fierstein as The Derelict 
 Charles S. Dutton as Assistant District Attorney (as Charles Dutton) 
 Skye Bassett as Anna 
 Garrett M. Brown as Gordon 
 Ellen Barber as Patty Garretson 
 Reathel Bean as Lieutenant Arnold Goodson 
 Chris Noth as Roy Burnette 
 Diana Reis as Jean 
 Joe Zaloom as Street Vendor

Home media
The film was released on VHS by HBO/Cannon Video under license from Home Box Office. However, it never released on DVD or Blu-ray.

Critical reception
The film was considered notably violent for cable television of the day: one critic wrote "there's lots of gore... the screen is littered with bodies and the sound track is filled with obscenities". Despite the caveats, the same critic added: "It's good enough to hook you though. Once you start watching you stick around to find out what happens." In the Chicago Tribune, a reviewer wrote that although the story "alternates between the suspenseful and the silly", it remains "intriguing because of its quirky premise". Gannett News Service reviewer Mike Hughes sighed that the plot relied on "absurdities and coincidences", but offered praise for Warren's expressive acting and Bierman's mood-setting direction.

Syndicated columnist Judy Flander called it "a stylish thriller" and "a great watch", chiefly because of Warren who "glows" in her role. Critic Tom Shales, however, heaped scorn on the film for its "miserably nasty" and "pointlessly perverse" storyline, describing it as all "foul language, violence and miscellaneous kinks".

References

External links

1986 television films
1986 films
HBO Films films
American serial killer films
1980s serial killer films
1986 thriller films
Films based on American novels
American thriller television films
Films about fictional painters
1980s English-language films
Films directed by Robert Bierman
1980s American films